The Straubing Spiders are an American football team from Straubing, Germany. The club's greatest success came in 2021 when it won the southern division of the German Football League 2 and earned promotion to the German Football League.

History 
The Spiders were founded in 1984. In 1987 they finished the Regionalliga Süd a German third tier league in first place and got promoted to the 2. Bundesliga (now "GFL2"). From 1988 to 1992 the Spiders were members of 2. Bundesliga. Seven years later to the 1999 season the Spiders reentered the 2. Bundesliga for another four seasons. In 2017 they got promoted to the GFL2 for the third time. The 2021 season the Spiders finished the league in the first place playing a perfect season. In the succeeding promotion round their opponents Stuttgart Scorpions withdrew whereby the Spiders entered the German Football League – the greatest success in the team's history.

Honours

 GFL
 Play-off qualification: 2022
 League membership: 2022
 GFL2
 Southern Division champions: 2021

Recent seasons
Recent seasons of the Spiders:

 PR = Promotion round
 QF = Quarter finals

References

External links 
  Official website
  German Football League official website
  Football History Historic American football tables from Germany

American football teams in Germany
German Football League teams
American football teams established in 1984
1984 establishments in Germany